Shani Nushi Sports Hall is a multi–use sports hall in Gjakovë, Kosovo which is the home of both the KB Vëllaznimi basketball and KH Vëllaznimi handball teams.

History
In July 2010, the Gjakovë municipality spent €50,000 on renovations to the sports hall. In September 2012, work began on a complete renovation of the sports hall with funding from the local and central governments as well as the European Union that amounted to €1.1 million.

References

Gjakova
Sports venues in Kosovo